Elections to the French National Assembly were held in Guinea on 2 June 1946.

Electoral system
The two seats allocated to the constituency were elected on two separate electoral rolls; French citizens elected one MP from the first college, whilst non-citizens elected one MP in the second college.

Results

First College

Second College

References

Guinea
1946 06
1946 in French Guinea
Guinea
1946